Declan McDaid (born 22 November 1995) is a Scottish footballer who plays as a midfielder for Irish club Bohemians. McDaid started his career as a youth player at Greenock Morton, before being promoted to the club's first team in April 2013. However, McDaid left the club a short time later and signed for (then) Scottish First Division side Partick Thistle in June 2013. After two successful seasons with Ayr United, he signed for Scottish Championship side Dundee in June 2019 and would enjoy promotion to the Scottish Premiership with them in 2021. He would also play for Falkirk on loan.

Club career

Greenock Morton
Whilst still in school, Morton received a £35,000 verbal offer from Celtic but rejected it to allow him to complete his schooling.

Born in Dunoon, McDaid made his debut across the River Clyde for Greenock Morton's first-team on 6 April 2013, coming on as a late substitute in a 5–2 victory over Airdrie United. He chose to reject an offer of a full-time contract with the club and left in 2013.

Partick Thistle
McDaid joined newly promoted Scottish Premiership club Partick Thistle on 21 June 2013, initially to play for Thistle's under 20 squad. Just 20 seconds after coming on as a substitute against St Mirren, McDaid assisted Christie Elliott for a goal in the seventy-fifth minute. Thistle eventually won the game 1–0. On 18 February 2015, McDaid signed a new contract, keeping him at Partick Thistle until the summer of 2017. However, McDaid left Thistle on 31 January 2017, after the club agreed to terminate his contract.

Cowdenbeath (loan)
In January 2016, McDaid moved to Scottish League One side Cowdenbeath on loan, with the purpose of gaining some first-team experience.
McDaid scored his first ever professional goal on 20 February 2016 scoring for Cowdenbeath in a 3–2 home defeat to Peterhead making it 1–1 at the time.

Ayr United
After leaving Partick Thistle, McDaid signed a short-term deal with Scottish League One side Ayr United on 31 January 2017. He scored his first goal for Ayr in a Scottish Cup round of 16 replay with Clyde in February 2017. With Ayr, McDaid would win League One in the 2017–18 season, and would follow that up with an impressive season in the Scottish Championship, finishing 4th place and qualifying for the Scottish Premiership playoffs, though were unsuccessful in their attempts at consecutive promotions.

Dundee
McDaid signed a two-year deal with Dundee in June 2019, which would later be extended to three years. He opened his scoring account for the Dark Blues by scoring both goals in a 2–0 win over Arbroath, and followed that up a couple weeks later with a long-range goal and Man of the Match performance against his former side Ayr United. 

On 29 January, McDaid was announced to be returning to former club Partick Thistle, now in League One, on loan in January 2021 until the end of the season. However, due to teams in the third tier and lower being unable to play due to COVID-19 restrictions in Scotland, he was unable to play for the Jags, and would play for Dundee again in February. The club would confirm in March that McDaid would stay with the club for the remainder of the season. McDaid's form would pick up, and he would be a part of the Dundee side which won the Premiership play-offs and gained promotion to the Scottish Premiership. McDaid would leave Dundee following the end of his contract in May 2022.

Falkirk (loan) 
In September 2021, McDaid joined Scottish League One side Falkirk on loan until January 2022. He would return to Dens in January after making 9 appearances with the Bairns.

Bohemians 
In July 2022, McDaid signed for League of Ireland club Bohemians.

International career
McDaid was first called into the Scotland Schools U18 squad in 2013 after his performances in the Morton reserve side which finished second in the SFL Reserve League.

McDaid would start all four games in the Centenary Cup, and scored against England at McDiarmid Park.

Career statistics

References

External links

1995 births
Living people
Scottish footballers
Greenock Morton F.C. players
Partick Thistle F.C. players
Cowdenbeath F.C. players
Ayr United F.C. players
Scottish Football League players
Association football midfielders
Footballers from Greenock
Scottish Professional Football League players
Dundee F.C. players
Falkirk F.C. players
Scottish expatriate sportspeople in Ireland
League of Ireland players
Bohemian F.C. players